Khatauli Rural is a census town in Muzaffarnagar district in the Indian state of Uttar Pradesh.

Demographics
As of the 2001 India census, Jeewna had a population of 10,737. Males constitute 53% of the population and females 47%. Jeewna has an average literacy rate of 48%, lower than the national average of 59.5%: male literacy is 57%, and female literacy is 37%. In Jeewna, 21% of the population is under six years of age.

References

Cities and towns in Muzaffarnagar district